This article presents the official statistics collected during the COVID-19 pandemic in Indonesia.

Cases by province and region

Cumulative numbers

Daily numbers

Testing 
At first, the government only published the numbers of people being tested. Since 15 April 2020, they started to publish the numbers of tested specimens. Tested people and specimens reported on Mondays and day after public holidays are normally lower as most testing labs are closed on the day before. Antigen rapid test results are counted with RT-PCR and TCM results starting from 3 March 2021.

Vaccination

Demography

By genders

By ages

Others

Foreigners in Indonesia 
As of 27 January 2022, at least 6,190 foreigners were tested positive for COVID-19 in Indonesia, of which 5,840 recovered, 32 died, and 413 had returned to their respective countries or territories.

Indonesians abroad

References

External links 
 COVID19.go.id

COVID-19 pandemic in Indonesia
Indonesia